Albin Lesky (7 July 1896 in Graz – 28 February 1981) was an Austrian classical philologist. He was married to Austrian historian of medicine Erna Lesky.

List of works 

 Strom ohne Brücke. Leykam, Graz 1918.
 Alkestis, der Mythus und das Drama. Hölder-Pichler-Tempsky, Wien 1925.
 Die griechische Tragödie. Kröner, Stuttgart 1938.
 Der Kosmos der Choephoren. Hölder-Pichler-Tempsky, Wien 1943.
 Humanismus als Erbe und Aufgabe. Rauch, Innsbruck 1946.
 Erziehung. Tyrolia, Innsbruck 1946.
 Thalatta. Rohrer, Wien 1947.
 Die Maske des Thamyris. Rohrer, Wien 1951.
 Sophokles und das Humane. Rohrer, Wien 1952.
 Die Homerforschung in der Gegenwart. Sexl, Wien 1952.
 Die Entzifferung von Linear B. Rohrer, Wien 1954.
 Die tragische Dichtung der Hellenen. Vandenhoeck & Ruprecht, Göttingen 1956.
 Geschichte der griechischen Literatur. Francke, Bern 1957; 2. Auflage Bern/München 1963.
 Göttliche und menschliche Motivation im homerischen Epos. Winter, Heidelberg 1961.
 Gesammelte Schriften. Francke, Bern 1966.
 Homeros. Druckenmüller, Stuttgart 1967.
 Herakles und das Ketos. Österreichische Akademie der Wissenschaften, Wien 1967.
 Vom Eros der Hellenen. Vandenhoeck & Ruprecht, Göttingen 1976.
 Epos, Epyllion und Lehrgedicht. In: Ernst Vogt (Hrsg.): Griechische Literatur. Wiesbaden 1981 (= Neues Handbuch der Literaturwissenschaft. Band 2), S. 19–72.

References 

 https://badw.de/fileadmin/nachrufe/Lesky%20Albin.pdf
 https://www.deutsche-biographie.de/gnd118727761.html#ndbcontent

Austrian philologists
1896 births
1981 deaths
20th-century philologists
People from Graz
Classical philologists
Place of death missing
Corresponding Fellows of the British Academy